The STU-I, like its successors sometimes known as a "stew phone", was a secure telephone developed by the U.S. National Security Agency for use by senior U.S. government officials in the 1970s.

See also
KY-3
Navajo I
STU-II
STU-III
SCIP

References

External links
Crypto Museum - STU I
Delusion.org - National Cryptologic Museum pictures

National Security Agency encryption devices
Secure communication